LBN 114.55+00.22 is an emission nebula in the constellation Cassiopeia. Named after the astronomer who published a catalogue of nebulae in 1965, LBN stands for “Lynds Bright Nebula." The numbers 114.55+00.22 refer to nebula's coordinates in the Milky Way Galaxy. Dust blocks most of the visible light from this nebula.

References

Emission nebulae
Cassiopeia (constellation)